This is a list of roads designated A15. Entries are sorted in alphabetical order by name of country.

 A015 road (Argentina), a road connecting the junction with National Route 14 at La Criolla and the Salto Grande Dam access-road
 A15 road (Australia) may refer to:
 A15 highway (South Australia), a road in the western suburbs of Adelaide
 A15 highway (New South Wales), a road in the Hunter Valley and New England regions
 A15 motorway (Belgium), a road connecting La Louvière and Liège 
 A-15 expressway (Canada), a road connecting the United States border at Saint-Bernard-de-Lacolle and Sainte-Agathe-des-Monts
 A15 motorway (France), a road connecting Gennevilliers, Hauts-de-Seine and Cergy-Pontoise, Val d'Oise
 A 15 motorway (Germany), a road connecting Berlin and the German-Polish border
 A15 motorway (Italy), a road connecting Parma and La Spezia
 A15 road (Latvia), a road around Rēzekne
 A15 highway (Lithuania), a road connecting Vilnius and Lyda
 A15 road (Malaysia), a road in Perak connecting Batu Gajah and Kampung Gajah
 A15 motorway (Netherlands), a road connecting Rotterdam and the interchange Ressen
 A15 motorway (Portugal), a road connecting Caldas da Rainha and Óbidos
 A-15 motorway (Spain), a road connecting Tudela and San Sebastián
 A 15 road (Sri Lanka), a road connecting  Batticaloa and Trincomalee
 A15 road (United Kingdom) may refer to:
 A15 road (England), a road connecting Peterborough and the junction with the M180 near Scawby
 A15 road (Isle of Man), or Maughold road
 A15 road (United States of America) may refer to:
 County Route A15 (California), a road in Plumas County connecting SR 89, SR 36, and SR 70 in Portola

See also 
 List of highways numbered 15